Alexandre Paul was an independent candidate for president in the 2005 Haitian election. Born in Port-au-Prince, he graduated from the Petit Seminaire College St Martial where he spent all his academic years. After the Baccalaureat he obtained a degree from the Hautes Etudes Internationales et Diplomatie, a new university.  Later, he was able to earn a licence in law. He studied Government and Politics at St. John's University in New York. In 1993, he earn the degree of Juris Doctor at Brigham Young University.

After working at the National Bank for 14 years, Paul was posted at the United Nations as a Minister Consellor. He served there for three years. Then he was transferred to the Bahamas where he served six years. Transferred as chargé d'affaires to England and then to Miami, Florida as Consul General. Appearing little in public, he was a prominent diplomat and a controversial figure in Miami for his four years there. A staunch supporter of Baby Doc Duvalier, he was ousted from this post when Duvalier fell from power in 1986.

In 1993 he was the head attorney for the electoral counsel (Conseil Electoral Provisoire). He distinguished himself as a person who defended the Haitians by all legal means.

After spending three years as a prisoner in Haiti, he became convinced that the voice of one man could make a difference and ran as a presidential candidate. As a candidate he called for the respect of the laws for the good of all citizens whatever their social status. He wrote many articles in Haitian newspapers: Le Nouvelliste and Le Matin, in the Bahamas in the Nassau Guardian and in Florida in the Miami Herald.

Paul is a member of the Church of Jesus Christ of Latter-day Saints (LDS Church). He joined the church in 1980 when he was Counsel General for Haiti in the Bahamas.

As of 2010 Paul was living in Provo, Utah.

Notes

References
"Happy in Haiti celebrating dedication's 20th year", Church News, May 3, 2003

Living people
J. Reuben Clark Law School alumni
Candidates for President of Haiti
Converts to Mormonism
Haitian Latter Day Saints
Haitian prisoners and detainees
Haitian emigrants to the United States
People from Provo, Utah
Prisoners and detainees of Haiti
20th-century Haitian lawyers
Black Mormons
St. John's University (New York City) alumni
Haitian expatriates in the Bahamas
Year of birth missing (living people)